Imanol Iriberri (born March 4, 1987 in Mar del Plata, Argentina) is an Argentine footballer who plays for Hibernians, in the Maltese Premier League.

References

External links
 

1987 births
Living people
Argentine footballers
Argentine expatriate footballers
Argentine people of Basque descent
Independiente F.B.C. footballers
Aldosivi footballers
Deportes Tolima footballers
C.D. Jorge Wilstermann players
Sport Boys Warnes players
Deportivo La Guaira players
Crucero del Norte footballers
Boavista F.C. players
Sportivo Carapeguá footballers
Estudiantes de Mérida players
Sabail FK players
Hibernians F.C. players
A.C.C.D. Mineros de Guayana players
Club Atlético Alvarado players
Categoría Primera A players
Venezuelan Primera División players
Bolivian Primera División players
Maltese Premier League players
Primera Nacional players
Primeira Liga players
Paraguayan Primera División players
Azerbaijan Premier League players
Argentine expatriate sportspeople in Paraguay
Argentine expatriate sportspeople in Colombia
Argentine expatriate sportspeople in Venezuela
Argentine expatriate sportspeople in Bolivia
Argentine expatriate sportspeople in Portugal
Argentine expatriate sportspeople in Malta
Expatriate footballers in Paraguay
Expatriate footballers in Colombia
Expatriate footballers in Venezuela
Expatriate footballers in Bolivia
Expatriate footballers in Portugal
Expatriate footballers in Azerbaijan
Expatriate footballers in Malta
Association football forwards
Argentine expatriate sportspeople in Azerbaijan
Sportspeople from Mar del Plata